Four Generations Under One Roof (四世同堂 Si Shi Tong Tang) is a 1944 novel by Lao She describing the life of the Chinese people during the Japanese Occupation. The novel is divided into three parts：Part 1 - Bewilderment (惶惑) .Part 2 - Ignominy (偷生).Part 3 - Famine (饥荒)

An abridged translation The Yellow Storm by Ida Pruitt appeared in 1951.
It was only in 1982 that Four Generations Under One Roof  was published in its unabridged form that the full picture became known to Chinese readers. In 2016, about 100,000 words of the original English manuscript of Famine, in paragraphs 21 to 36 of Four Generations Under One Roof were recovered.

Process of creation 
The production of Four Generations Under One Roof began in 1944. Lao She is in the creation of the novel begins in 1941, this is the Peking subjugate of the fifth year, the Anti-Japanese War entered the stage of strategic stalemate literature in the national situation, literary circle showed unity of pace and high patriotism. Lao She had sprouted in such an environment to create a story about the idea of Anti-Japanese War stories. But suffer from lack of suitable subject matter therefore and shelve for a time. It was not until 1944, when the Anti-Japanese War entered the counter-offensive phase, that Lao She came up with a complete framework for the novel from his wife's experience and began to write the novel in Chongqing. The novel lasted four years, between the victory of the Anti-Japanese War and the author's invitation to go abroad to give lectures. It was not until 1948 that Lao She finished the million-word saga in the United States.
<references group="LaoShe. 

With Pearl S. Buck's help, Lao She finally completed the finale of Four Generations Under One Roof part 3- Famine, in his rented apartment in New York at the end of June 1948.  American publishers took a fancy to Four Generations Under One Roof and decided to publish it in English.Lao She readily agreed and found  Ida Pruitt, and the two translated together. Lao She sent  Pearl S. Buck the first 10 chapters they had translated together for verification.  Pearl S. Buck thought they were very good, so Lao She and Pruitt went on to finish the translation. The English translation, though somewhat abridged, consists of 100 chapters and was renamed The Yellow Storm and published in 1951. The book received much acclaim after it was published. In the same year, Four Generations Under a Roof was released in Japan, causing strong reactions and becoming a best-seller.

After returning to China, Lao She gave the manuscript of Famine to Zhou Erfu(周而复), chief editor of Shanghai Literature Magazine. In 1950, "Famine" was serialized in Literary magazine, and when it reached chapter 87, the magazine suddenly ran out. The original manuscript of the last 13 chapters was also destroyed during  "The Cultural Revolution". After the end of  "The Cultural Revolution", the relevant organizations returned the goods, Lao She's son Shu Yi （舒乙）found the English version of Four Generations Under One Roof mailed to Lao She by the American publishing house. In order to make up for the missing parts of the Chinese version, In 1983, the People's Literature Publishing House translated the last 13 paragraphs from the English version of Four Generations Under One Roof, so that the complete picture of the trilogy was restored in 100 paragraphs.

In September 2017, the classic novel of modern Chinese literature Four Generations Under One Roof was published by the Oriental Publishing Center. This is the first time the book has been published in full form since its publication.

Appreciation of novel 

"Four Generations Under a Roof" narrates the profound disasters of nation, revealing the suffering of the country everywhere. In the novel, the expression of social trends in the period of suffering is real, and the ideological theme of "living without life is self-destruction" is more prominent due to the standard color and lyrical atmosphere of the novel. In the context of the Anti-Japanese War, the novel critically reflects on the national bad habits caused by the family culture in the traditional Chinese culture, and this rational reflection is accompanied by the author's emotional attachment to the family ethics. Four Generations Under One Roof takes an ordinary hutong in Beijing during the Anti-Japanese War as the specific environment for the story to unfold. The humiliated and tragic experiences of a number of small figures in several families reflect the bewildered mentality of the Beijing citizens during the eight-year Anti-Japanese War, and reproduce their slow, painful and difficult awakening process when the country was destroyed and their families were destroyed. This work focuses on examining the Chinese family culture and rationally examining and criticizing its negative factors.  The profound ideological implication of this work shows that the rise and fall of a nation not only depends on its developed economy and advanced weapons, but also depends on the general social mentality of the nation. Why a great country with a splendid civilization for thousands of years was invaded by the Japanese cannot but cause deep introspection on the part of intellectuals including the author. The work tells us that if the Chinese people do not change the cultural mentality of "many children, many happiness" and break the ideal of a four-generation family, the Chinese people, no matter how large the population, no matter how strong the body, will only be exposed to the public and spectators in a meaningless way.

Influence of Fiction 

Zhu Donglin: "One of the most acclaimed novels and one of the best novels published in the United States at the same time."

Kong Qingdong: "The most valuable thing about Lao She's Four Generations in the Same House is that it can present positive power in a peaceful natural state, showing the unyielding spirit of people in daily life, thus highlighting the idea that evil does not overpower good."

At the end of his preface to the French version of "Four Generations Under a Roof" ，Jean-Marie Gustave Le Clézio，the French writer who won the 2008 Nobel Prize in Literature, wrote："Lao She, with the eyes of a master, inspired me."

Publication Information 

This form is the source of information

References 

Novels by Lao She
1944 novels
Chinese novels adapted into television series
Chinese novels adapted into plays
Novels set in Beijing